The Nokia 5220 XpressMusic is a mobile telephone handset Nokia released in Q3 2008.  Its design features an unusual asymmetric shape.

Specifications

External links 
 Official Nokia Europe 5220 Product Page 
 Review of the 5220 on cnet.co.uk

5220